The 2019 World Mixed Doubles Qualification Event was held December 2–7, 2019 at the Greenacres Curling Club in Howwood, Scotland. It was the inaugural qualification event for the World Mixed Doubles Curling Championship, which was previously an open entry event. 

The tournament was open to any World Curling Federation member not already qualified for the 2020 World Mixed Doubles Curling Championship with the top four teams from this event qualifying to play in the Championship in Kelowna, Canada. The four teams that qualified were Germany, Italy, South Korea and China.

Teams
Twenty-eight teams are registered for the tournament:

Round robin standings
Final Round Robin Standings

The top two teams in each group qualify for the playoffs.

Round robin results
All draws are listed in Greenwich Mean Time (UTC±00:00)

Draw 1
Monday, December 2, 17:15

Draw 2
Monday, December 2, 20:30

Draw 3
Tuesday, December 3, 09:00

Draw 4
Tuesday, December 3, 12:30

Draw 5
Tuesday, December 3, 16:00

Draw 6
Tuesday, December 3, 19:30

Draw 7
Wednesday, December 4, 09:00

Draw 8
Wednesday, December 4, 12:30

Draw 9
Wednesday, December 4, 16:00

Draw 10
Wednesday, December 4, 19:30

Draw 11
Thursday, December 5, 09:00

Draw 12
Thursday, December 5, 12:30

Draw 13
Thursday, December 5, 16:00

Draw 14
Thursday, December 5, 19:30

Playoffs

Source:

A Bracket

B Bracket

A Event

Semifinals
Friday, December 6, 10:00

Finals
Friday, December 6, 15:00

B Event

Semifinals
Friday, December 6, 15:00

Finals
Saturday, December 7, 10:00

References 

International curling competitions hosted by Scotland
World_Mixed_Doubles_Qualification_Event
World_Mixed_Doubles_Qualification_Event
World_Mixed_Doubles_Qualification_Event
World Mixed Doubles Curling Championship
Sport in Renfrewshire

External links
Official website